Agg or AGG may refer to:

As an acronym:
 Anti-Grain Geometry, computer graphics rendering library
 Aesthetic group gymnastics, gymnastics In a group
 Abnormal grain growth, materials science phenomenon
 Art Gallery of Guelph
 AGG (programming language)
 Attorney General of the Gambia
 Attorney General of Georgia
 Attorney General of Ghana
 Attorney General of Gibraltar
 Attorney General of Grenada
 Attorney General of Guam
 Attorney General of Guatemala
 Attorney General of Guyana
 Auditor-General of Ghana

As another abbreviation or symbol:
 Angor language (ISO 639-3 code)
 Arginine, an amino acid with codon AGG
 iShares Core Total US Bond Market ETF, an exchange-traded fund
 Tirofiban, trade name Aggrastat, an antiplatelet drug

People:
 Alfred John Agg (1830–1886), Australian colonial public servant
 Antonio Gandy-Golden (born 1998), American football player

See also
 Species aggregate, abbreviated "agg."